The Department of Business and Consumer Affairs was an Australian government department that existed between December 1975 and May 1982.

Scope
Information about the department's functions and/or government funding allocation could be found in the Administrative Arrangements Orders, the annual Portfolio Budget Statements and in the Department's annual reports.

At its creation, the Department was responsible for the following:
Business practices
Duties of customs and excise
Bounties on the production or export of goods
Bankruptcy and insolvency
Patents of inventions and designs, and trade marks
Copyrights
Consumer Affairs.

Structure
The Department was an Australian Public Service department, staffed by officials who were responsible to the Minister for Business and Consumer Affairs.

References

Ministries established in 1975
Business and Consumer Affairs
1975 establishments in Australia
1982 disestablishments in Australia